The 2014–15 season was Portsmouth's 116th season of existence. Portsmouth played in League Two for the second consecutive season, after a run of good results late in the last season saved the club from another relegation.

Players

Squad details

Transfers

In

Total spending:  £20.000

Out

Total gaining:  £0

Contracts

Player statistics

Squad stats

|-
|colspan="14"|Players on loan to other clubs:
|-
|colspan="14"|Players who have left the club after the start of the season:

|-
|}

Top scorers

Disciplinary record

Competition

Pre-season

League Two

League table

Results summary

Results by round

Matches
The fixtures for the 2014–15 season were announced on 18 June 2014 at 9am.

FA Cup

The draw for the first round of the FA Cup was made on 27 October 2014.

League Cup

The draw for the first round was made on 17 June 2014 at 10am. Portsmouth were drawn at home to Peterborough United.

Football League Trophy

References

Portsmouth
Portsmouth F.C. seasons